Somis (Chumash: Śo Mís) is an unincorporated community in Ventura County, California. It was established in 1892 by Thomas Bard and D.T. Perkins on a portion of the Rancho Las Posas Mexican land grant.
Somis is in the Las Posas Valley on the south bank of Fox Barranca, just west of Arroyo Las Posas. For statistical purposes, the United States Census Bureau has defined Somis as a census-designated place (CDP).

Name 
The name of this townsite is derived from the Chumash term śo mís, meaning “water of the scrub oak.” There was a Ranchería named Somes noted in records from 1795 and 1796.

History
Like many of the farms on the adjacent Oxnard Plain, the crops of corn, wheat and barley grown here were shipped through the wharf that had been constructed in Hueneme in 1871. Agricultural products were able to be shipped by rail when the line from Los Angeles to San Francisco was routed through the valley and a stop was established adjacent to the community. The current spelling of the name was established when the railroad came through.

Geography
The school provides a sense of community for the town and the surrounding rural agricultural area that lies within the Somis Union School District boundary. The Census Bureau definition of the area does not precisely correspond to the local understanding of the historical area of the community. Several structures have been designated County of Ventura Landmarks. The Camarillo station is the nearest stop for Amtrak and Metrolink trains and is served by Amtrak's Pacific Surfliner from San Luis Obispo to San Diego and Metrolink's Ventura County Line from Los Angeles Union Station to east Ventura.

Somis Road (SR 34), the main thoroughfare, is lined with a few shops, businesses and a county fire station and intersects State Route 118 (Los Angeles Avenue) just north of town after crossing Fox Barranca. The railroad, which is parallel with Los Angeles Avenue between Somis and Moorpark, turns and becomes parallel with Somis Road at the south end of town where they located the railroad stop for shipping agricultural products. The tracks continue south to the Camarillo Station and the intersection with US 101.

Shown as Central Avenue on the original plat filed by Bard, Somis Road runs in a north-south direction through the middle of the townsite. The parallel roads on either side are named West Street and East Street. Three streets are oriented in an east-west direction. The most northerly, named North Street, was extended northwesterly with plats filed in 1948 and 1953 that subdivided additional town lots.

It is primarily an agricultural area, but is home to a hardware store, a market with a Mexican cafe, a post office, an elementary school, several shops, a small animal hospital, one main residential tract and numerous estates and ranches. It has no formal local government, but it is serviced by the Ventura County Sheriff's Department and the Ventura County Fire Department.

Forbes Magazine ranked Somis the 108th most-expensive ZIP code in the United States in 2015. Somis had the highest median home prices in Ventura County in 1999.

Climate
This region experiences warm (but not hot) and dry summers, with no average monthly temperatures above . According to the Köppen Climate Classification system, Somis has a warm-summer Mediterranean climate, abbreviated "Csb" on climate maps.

References 

Unincorporated communities in Ventura County, California
Populated places established in 1892
Unincorporated communities in California